Li'l Abner is a satirical American comic strip that appeared across multiple newspapers in the United States, Canada and Europe. It featured a fictional clan of hillbillies in the impoverished mountain village of Dogpatch, USA. Written and drawn by Al Capp (1909–1979), the strip ran for 43 years – from August 13, 1934, through November 13, 1977. The Sunday page debuted six months after the daily, on February 24, 1935. It was originally distributed by United Feature Syndicate and, later by the Chicago Tribune New York News Syndicate.

Comic strips typically dealt with northern urban experiences before Capp introduced Li'l Abner, the first strip based in the South. The comic strip had 60 million readers in over 900 American newspapers and 100 foreign papers in 28 countries.

Cast

Main characters
He was portrayed as a naive, simpleminded, gullible and sweet-natured hillbilly. He lived in a ramshackle log cabin with his pint-sized parents. Capp derived the family name "Yokum" as a combination of yokel and hokum. (Although it is also the approximate Northern European pronunciation of the name "Joachim".) In Capp's satirical and often complex plots, Abner was a country bumpkin Candide—a paragon of innocence in a sardonically dark and cynical world. Abner had no visible means of support, although his character earned his livelihood as a "crescent cutter" for the Little Wonder Privy Company and later "mattress tester" for the Stunned Ox Mattress Company. During World War II, the Abner character was drafted into the role as mascot emblem of the Patrol Boat Squadron 29. In one post-World War II storyline, Abner became a US Air Force bodyguard of Steve Cantor (a parody of Steve Canyon) against the evil bald female spy Jewell Brynner (a parody of actor Yul Brynner). Early in the strip's history, Abner's primary goal in the storyline was evading the marital designs of Daisy Mae Scragg, the virtuous, voluptuous, barefoot Dogpatch damsel and scion of the Yokums' blood feud enemies — the Scraggs, who were her character's bloodthirsty kinfolk. For 18 years of the run of the strip, Abner slipped out of Daisy Mae's marital crosshairs time and time again. When Capp finally gave in to reader pressure and allowed the couple to tie the knot, it was a major media event. It even made the cover of Life magazine on March 31, 1952 — illustrating an article by Capp titled "It's Hideously True!! The Creator of Li'l Abner Tells Why His Hero Is (SOB!) Wed!!"

Daisy Mae Yokum (née Scragg): Beautiful Daisy Mae's character was hopelessly in love with Dogpatch's most prominent resident throughout the entire 43-year run of Al Capp's comic strip. During most of the epic, the impossibly dense Abner exhibited little romantic interest in her voluptuous charms (much of it visible daily thanks to her famous polka-dot peasant blouse and cropped skirt). In 1952, Abner reluctantly proposed to Daisy to emulate the engagement of his comic strip "ideel", Fearless Fosdick. Fosdick's own wedding to longtime fiancée Prudence Pimpleton turned out to be a dream — but Abner and Daisy's ceremony, performed by Marryin' Sam, was permanent. Abner and Daisy Mae's nuptials were a major source of media attention, landing them on the aforementioned cover of Life magazine's March 31, 1952, issue. Once married, Abner became relatively domesticated. Like Mammy Yokum and the other "wimmenfolk" in Dogpatch, Daisy Mae did all the work, domestic and otherwise — while the menfolk generally did nothing whatsoever.

Mammy Yokum: Born Pansy Hunks, Mammy was the scrawny, highly principled "sassiety" leader and bare knuckle "champeen" of the town of Dogpatch. She had married the inconsequential Pappy Yokum in 1902; they produced two strapping sons twice their own size. Mammy dominated the Yokum clan through the force of her personality, and dominated everyone else with her fearsome right uppercut (sometimes known as her "Goodnight, Irene" punch), which helped her uphold law, order and decency. She is consistently the toughest character throughout Li'l Abner. A superhuman dynamo, Mammy did all the household chores — and provided her charges with no fewer than eight meals a day of "po'k chops" and "tarnips" (as well as local Dogpatch delicacies like "candied catfish eyeballs" and "trashbean soup"). Her authority was unquestioned, and her characteristic phrase, "Ah has spoken!", signaled the end of all further discussion. Her most familiar phrase, however, is "Good is better than evil becuz it's nicer!" (Upon his retirement in 1977, Capp declared Mammy to be his personal favorite of all his characters.) Li'l Abner's mom is the only character in the Dogpatch universe capable of defeating him in hand-to-hand combat.

Pappy Yokum: Born Lucifer Ornamental Yokum, pint-sized Pappy had the misfortune of being the patriarch in a family that didn't have one. Pappy was so lazy and ineffectual, he didn't even bathe himself. Mammy was regularly seen scrubbing Pappy in an outdoor oak tub ("Once a month, rain or shine"). Ironing Pappy's trousers fell under her wifely duties as well, although she didn't bother with preliminaries — like waiting for Pappy to remove them first. Pappy is dull-witted and gullible (in one storyline after he is conned by Marryin' Sam into buying Vanishing cream because he thinks it makes him invisible when he picks a fight with his nemesis Earthquake McGoon), but not completely without guile. He had an unfortunate predilection for snitching "preserved turnips" and smoking corn silk behind the woodshed — much to his chagrin when Mammy caught him. Pappy Yokum wasn't always feckless, however. After his lower wisdom teeth grew so long that they squeezed his cerebral Goodness Gland and emerged as forehead horns, he proved himself capable of evil. Mammy solved the problem with a tooth extraction and ended the episode with her most famous dictum.

Honest Abe Yokum: Li'l Abner and Daisy Mae's little boy was born in 1953 "after a pregnancy that ambled on so long that readers began sending me medical books", wrote Capp. Initially known as "Mysterious Yokum" (there was even an Ideal doll marketed under this name) due to a debate regarding his gender (he was stuck in a pants-shaped stovepipe for the first six weeks), he was renamed "Honest Abe" (after President Abraham Lincoln) to thwart his early tendency to steal. His first words were "po'k chop", and that remained his favorite food. Though his uncle Tiny was perpetually frozen at 15 "y'ars" old, Honest Abe gradually grew from infant to grade school age, and became a dead ringer for Washable Jones — the star of Capp's early "topper" strip. He would eventually acquire a couple of supporting character friends for his own semi-regularly featured adventures in the strip. In one storyline, he lives up to his nickname when during a nationwide search for a pair of socks sewn by Betsy Ross; after finding that his father was the current owner and preparing to trade them for the reward (a handshake from the President of the United States), he confesses at the last second that they were not his to give.

Tiny was unknown to the strip until September 1954, when a relative who had been raising him reminded Mammy that she'd given birth to a second "chile"  while visiting her 15 years earlier. (The relative explained that she would have dropped him off sooner, but waited until she happened to be in the neighborhood.) Capp introduced Tiny to fill the bachelor role played reliably for nearly two decades by Li'l Abner himself, until his fateful 1952 marriage threw the carefully orchestrated dynamic of the strip out of whack for a period. Pursued by local lovelies Hopeful Mudd and Boyless Bailey, Tiny was even dumber and more awkward than Abner, if that can be imagined. Tiny initially sported a bulbous nose like both of his parents, but eventually,  (through a plot contrivance) he was given a nose job, and his shaggy blond hair was buzz cut to make him more appealing.

Salomey: The Yokums' beloved pet pig. Cute, lovable and intelligent (arguably smarter than Abner, Tiny or Pappy), she was accepted as part of the family ("the youngest", as Mammy invariably introduces her). She is 100% "Hammus Alabammus" — an adorable species of pig, and the last female known in existence. A plump, juicy Hammus Alabammus is the rarest and most vital ingredient of "ecstasy sauce", an indescribably delicious gourmet delicacy. Consequently, Salomey is frequently targeted by unscrupulous sportsmen, hog breeders and gourmands (like J.R. Fangsley and Bounder J. Roundheels), as well as unsavory wild boars with improper intentions (such as Boar Scarloff and Porknoy). Her moniker was a pun on both salami and Salome.

Supporting characters and villains
 Marryin' Sam: A traveling (by mule) preacher who specializes in $2 weddings. He also offered the $8 "ultra-deluxe speshul", a spectacular ceremony in which Sam officiates while being drawn and quartered by four rampaging jackasses. He cleans up once a year — during Sadie Hawkins Day season, when slow-footed bachelors are dragged kicking and screaming to the altar by their prospective brides-to-be. Sam, whose face and figure were reportedly modeled after New York City mayor Fiorello LaGuardia, started out as a stock villain but gradually softened into a genial, opportunistic comic foil. He wasn't above chicanery to achieve his ends, and was warily viewed by Dogpatch menfolk as a traitor to his gender. Sam was prominently featured on the cover of Life in 1952 when he presided over the celebrated wedding of Li'l Abner and Daisy Mae. In the 1956 Broadway musical and 1959 film adaptation, Sam was played by rotund actor Stubby Kaye.
 Moonbeam McSwine: The unwashed but shapely form of languid, delectable Moonbeam was one of the iconic hallmarks of Li'l Abner — an unkempt, impossibly lazy, corncob pipe-smoking, flagrant (and fragrant), raven-haired, earthly (and earthy) woman. Beautiful Moonbeam preferred the company of pigs to suitors — much to the frustration of her equally lazy pappy, Moonshine McSwine. She was usually showcased luxuriating among the hogs, somewhat removed from the main action of the story, in a deliberate parody of glamour magazines and pinup calendars of the day. Capp designed her in caricature of his wife Catherine (minus the dirt), who had also suggested Daisy Mae's name. In one comic, it is revealed that she bears a striking resemblance to a wealthy, well-dressed and well-washed woman named Gloria Van Welbuilt, a famous socialite. Despite her lazy nature and dirty appearance, she was generally portrayed as good-natured and kind as shown when she ran off to Dogpatch, carrying two shmoos under her arms to save them from going extinct, wondering if humanity would ever be good enough for them. She also consoled Abner to stop worrying about being a father. Moonbeam also seemed to have interests in romance as in some strips, she was seen flirting with and even kissing various male characters, including Abner. She once expressed the desire to have a family of her own and she actually discussed the matter of trapping a husband (if she got cleaned up) with Abner. In one strip, it was revealed that Moonbeam was in fact in love with Abner when they were children. In the same strip, it was shown that Moonbeam's disposition for filth was born out of a failure to understand the turn-ons of Abner when he was a child. Strangely she actually disliked hogs as a child, but after seeing Abner ignoring the openly romantic advances of a clean Daisy Mae, she dived right into a mud hole headfirst where some hogs were wallowing to earn his love, believing that if Abner didn't like clean girls he must have liked them dirty. Much to her disappointment, however, this, too, failed to capture his attention. Moonbeam was also unknowingly the star of a horror movie directed by Rock Pincus, head film director of a race known as the Pincushions, from planet Pincus 7. Unfortunately, this venture ended in tragedy for Rock when he was unknowingly grilled, put into a hot dog bun and devoured while he was still alive.
 Hairless Joe and Lonesome Polecat: The proud purveyors of "Kickapoo Joy Juice" — a moonshine elixir of such stupefying potency that the fumes alone have been known to melt the rivets off battleships, possibly inspired by a real patent medicine named "Kickapoo Indian Sagwa" although it was produced in Connecticut. Concocted in a large wooden vat by the inseparable cave-dwelling buddies Lonesome Polecat (of the "Fried Dog" Indian tribe, later known as the Polecats, "the one tribe who have never been conquered") and Hairless Joe (a hirsute, club-wielding, modern Cro-Magnon — who frequently made good on his oft-repeated threat, "Ah'll bash yore haid in!") The ingredients of the brew are both mysterious and all-encompassing (much like the contents of their cave, which has been known to harbor prehistoric monsters). When a batch "needs more body", the formidable pair simply goes out and clubs one (often a moose), and tosses it in. Over the years, the "recipe" has called for live grizzly bears, panthers, kerosene, horseshoes and anvils, among other ingredients. An officially licensed soft drink called Kickapoo Joy Juice is still produced by the Monarch Beverage Company of Atlanta, Georgia. Lonesome Polecat was also the official team mascot of the Sioux City Soos (1940–1960), a former Minor League baseball franchise of Sioux City, Iowa.
 Joe Btfsplk: The world's worst jinx, Joe Btfsplk had a perpetually dark rain cloud over his head. Instantaneous bad luck befell anyone unfortunate enough to be in his vicinity. Though well-meaning and friendly, his reputation inevitably precedes him  so Joe is a very lonely little man and thus associates himself with the Scraggs, except in World War II when Joe decided to do his patriotic duty and associate himself with Hirohito. He has an apparently unpronounceable name, but creator Al Capp "pronounced" Btfsplk by simply blowing a "raspberry", or Bronx cheer. Joe's personal storm cloud became one of the most iconic images in the strip.

 Senator Jack S. Phogbound: His name was a thinly disguised variant on "jackass", as made plain in his deathless campaign slogan (see Dialogue and catchphrases). The senator was satirist Al Capp's parody of a blustering self-serving Southern politician. Before 1947, Phogbound had been known as Fogbound, but in that year Phogbound "blackmails his fellow Washington senators to appropriate two million dollars to establish Phogbound University", and its attendant brass statue of Phogbound, both reminiscent of self-aggrandizements by Huey Long; the name change allowed Capp to sharpen the joke by calling the university P.U. Phogbound is a corrupt, conspiratorial blowhard; he often wears a coonskin cap and carries an old fashioned flintlock rifle to impress his gullible constituents. In one sequence, Phogbound is unable to campaign in Dogpatch, so he sends his aides with an old, hot-air-filled gas bag that resembles him, and nobody noticed the difference.
 Available Jones: Avaricious Dogpatch entrepreneur Available Jones was always available for a price. He had many sidelines, including minding babies ("Dry" for 5¢, "Other kinds" for 10¢). He provided anything from safety pins to battleships, but his most famous "provision" was his cousin, Stupefyin' Jones.
 Stupefyin' Jones: A walking aphrodisiac, Stupefyin' was so drop-dead gorgeous that any male who glimpsed her froze petrified in his tracks and rooted to the spot. While she was generally favored by the males of Dogpatch, she could be deadly for a confirmed bachelor to encounter on Sadie Hawkins Day. Statuesque actress Julie Newmar became famous overnight for playing the small role in the 1956 Li'l Abner Broadway musical (and the 1959 film adaptation) without uttering a single line.

 General Bullmoose: Created by Al Capp in June 1953, Bashington T. Bullmoose was the epitome of a mercenary, cold-blooded capitalist tyrant tycoon. Bullmoose's bombastic motto (see Dialogue and catchphrases) was adapted by Capp from a statement made by Charles E. Wilson, the former head of General Motors when it was America's largest corporation. In 1952, Wilson told a Senate subcommittee, "What is good for the country is good for General Motors, and vice-versa." Wilson later served as United States Secretary of Defense under President Dwight D. Eisenhower. Bullmoose had a simple boyhood dream: to possess all the money in the world – which he very nearly did, as Bullmoose Industries seemed to own or control all businesses in Dogpatch. He had a milquetoast son named Weakfish, and was sometimes accompanied by his delectable "secretary", Bim Bovak (whose name was a pun on both "bimbo" and bombshell actress Kim Novak). Li'l Abner became embroiled in many globetrotting adventures with the ruthless, reactionary billionaire over the years. Despite his adamantine exterior, General Bullmoose was still capable of a kind of capitalist gallantry. "Those Slobbovians [q.v.] have done me out of a hundred thousand dollars!" he once exclaimed, after falling victim to a fraud. "Nearly an hour's income, bless 'em!"
 Wolf Gal: An irredeemably feral Amazonian beauty who was raised by wolves and preferred to live among them; she lured unwary Dogpatchers to their doom to feed her ravenous pack. Wolf Gal was possibly, and even probably a cannibal, but the point was never stressed since she considered herself an animal, as did the rest of Dogpatch. One of Capp's more popular villains, Wolf Gal was briefly merchandised in the fifties with her own comic book, doll, handpuppet, and even a latex Halloween mask.
 Earthquake McGoon: Billing himself as "the world's dirtiest wrassler", the bearded, bloated McGoon first appeared in Li'l Abner as a traveling exhibition wrestler in the late 1930s, and was reportedly partially based on real-life grappler Man Mountain Dean. He also has a look-alike cousin named Typhoon McGoon. McGoon became increasingly prominent in the Li'l Abner Cream of Wheat print ads of the 1940s, and later, with the early television exposure of gimmicky wrestlers such as Gorgeous George. Earthquake is the nastiest resident of neighboring Skonk Hollow — a nightmarish, notoriously lawless community where no sane Dogpatcher dares set foot. The randy McGoon often attempted to walk Daisy Mae home "Skonk Hollow style", the lascivious implications of which are never made specific.
 The (shudder!) Scraggs: Hulking, leering, gap-toothed twin miscreants Lem and Luke and their needlessly proud pappy, Romeo. Apelike and gleefully homicidal, the impossibly evil Scraggs were officially declared inhuman by an act of Congress, and passed the time by burning down orphanages just to have light to read by (although they quickly remembered that they were illiterate).  Distant kinfolk of Daisy Mae, they carried on a blood feud with the Yokums throughout the run of the strip; in their first introduction after being run out of a Kentucky county at gunpoint, they tried to kill Li'l Abner but were beaten up by both Abner and Mammy Yokum. Mammy then banished the Scraggs to Skonk Hollow with a dividing line between Skonk Hollow and Dogpatch, with the understanding that although the Scraggs couldn't cross the line, any member of Dogpatch who did cross became their prey. A long-lost kid sister, named "*@!!*!"-Belle Scragg, briefly joined the clan in 1947. Fetchingly attired in a prison-striped reform school miniskirt, "*@!!*!"-Belle was outwardly attractive but just as rotten as her siblings on the inside. Her censored first name was an expletive, compelling everyone who addressed her to apologize profusely afterward.
 Nightmare Alice: Dogpatch's own "conjurin' woman", a hideous, cackling crone who practiced Louisiana Voodoo and black magic. Capp named her after the carnival-themed horror film, Nightmare Alley (1947). She employs witchcraft to "whomp up" ghosts and monsters to do her bidding. She was occasionally assisted by Doctor Babaloo, a witch doctor of the Belgian Congo, as well as her demon-child niece Scary Lou, who specializes in vexing voodoo dolls that resemble Li'l Abner.
 Ole Man Mose: The mysterious Mose was reportedly hundreds of "y'ars" old, and lived like a hermit in a cave atop a mountain, obstinately refusing to "kick the bucket", which was conveniently positioned just outside his cave door. His wisdom is absolute ("Ole Man Mose — he knows!"), and his sought-after annual Sadie Hawkins Day predictions — though frustratingly cryptic and infuriatingly misleading — are nonetheless 100% accurate.
 Evil Eye Fleagle: Fleagle has a unique and terrifying skill: the evil eye. An ordinary "whammy", as he called it, could stop a charging bull in its tracks. A "double whammy" could fell a skyscraper, leaving Fleagle exhausted. His dreaded "triple whammy" could melt a battleship, but would practically kill Fleagle in the process. The zoot suit-clad Fleagle was a native of Brooklyn, and his burlesque New York accent was unmistakable — especially when addressing his "goil", the zaftig Shoiley. Fleagle was so popular, licensed plastic replicas of Fleagle's face were produced in the 1950s, to be worn like lapel pins. Battery-operated, the wearer could pull a string and produce a flashing light bulb "whammy". Fleagle was reportedly based on a real-life character, a Runyonesque local boxing trainer and hanger-on named Benjamin "Evil Eye" Finkle. Finkle and his famous "hex" were a ringside fixture in New York boxing circles during the 1930s/40s. Fleagle was vividly portrayed by character actor Al Nesor in the aforementioned stage play and film.
 J. Roaringham Fatback: The bloated, self-styled "Pork King" was a greedy, gluttonous, unscrupulous business tycoon. Incensed to find that Dogpatch cast a shadow on his breakfast egg, he had the whole community moved to his convenience.
 Gat Garson: Li'l Abner's doppelgänger, a murderous racketeer with a predilection for Daisy Mae.
 Aunt Bessie: Mammy's socialite kid sister, the Duchess of Bopshire, was the "white sheep" of the family. Bessie's string of marriages into Boston and Park Avenue aristocracy left her a class-conscious, condescending snob. Her status-seeking crusades to make Abner over and marry him off into high society were always doomed to failure. Aunt Bessie virtually disappeared from the strip after Abner and Daisy Mae's marriage in 1952, apparently having conceded defeat in her attempt to remake Abner in her own image as a social climber.
 Big Barnsmell: The lonely "inside man" at the "Skonk Works" — a dilapidated factory located on the remote outskirts of Dogpatch. Scores of locals are done in yearly by the toxic fumes of concentrated "skonk oil", which is brewed and barreled daily by Barnsmell and his cousin ("outside man" Barney Barnsmell) by grinding dead skunks and worn shoes into a smoldering still, for some unspecified purpose. His job played havoc with his social life ("He has an air about him", as Dogpatchers tactfully put it), and the name of his famous facility entered the modern lexicon via the Lockheed Skunk Works project.
 Soft-Hearted John: Dogpatch's impossibly mercenary, thoroughly blackhearted grocer, the ironically named Soft-Hearted John gleefully swindled and starved his clientele, and looked disturbingly satanic to boot. He had an idiot nephew who sometimes ran the store in his stead, aptly named Soft-Headed John.
 Smilin' Zack: Cadaverous, outwardly peaceable mountaineer with a menacing grin and an even more menacing shotgun, and preferred things "quiet" to the point of silence. Zack's moniker was a take-off on another comic strip, The Adventures of Smilin' Jack by Zack Mosley.
 Dr. Killmare: The local Dogpatch physician, who just happened to be a horse doctor. His name was a pun on the sunny Dr. Kildare of film, radio, and television fame. 
 Cap'n Eddie Ricketyback: Decrepit World War I aviator and proprietor/sole operator of the even more decrepit Dogpatch Airlines. Cap'n Eddie's name was a spoof of decorated World War I flying ace, Eddie Rickenbacker. In 1970, Cap'n Eddie and his firm Trans-Dogpatch Airlines were awarded the West Berlin Route by his old rival Count Felix Von Holenhedt.
 Count Felix Von Holenhedt: German flying ace who in 1970 (age 89) was appointed as West German Civil Aviation Chief. He was never photographed without his World War I spiked helmet on his head. He wore it to cover the hole in his head that had been caused by being shot "clean through th' haid, in a dogfight over Flanders Field in 1918" by Cap'n Eddie Ricketyback. Nonetheless, the two old enemies eventually patched things up; Cap'n Ricketyback even persuaded the Count to settle in the States. "Jah!" cried the Count. "I got a cousin in Milvaukee!" Von Holenhedt was also the only person able to properly play the "pfschlngg". This was a complexly shaped brass instrument, part of whose tubing needed to pass through the player's head.
 Weakeyes Yokum: Before Mister Magoo there was Dogpatch's own Cousin Weakeyes, who would tragically mistake grizzly bears for romantically inclined "rich gals" in fur coats, and end a sequence by characteristically walking off a cliff.
 Young Eddie McSkonk and U.S. Mule: Ancient, creaky, white-bearded Dogpatch postmaster and his hoary jackass mount. They were usually too feeble to handle the sacks of timeworn, cobweb-covered letters marked "Rush" at the Dogpatch Express Post Office.
 J. Colossal McGenius: The brilliant marketing consultant and "idea man" who charged $10,000 per word for his sought-after business advice. McGenius was given to telling long-winded jokes with forgotten punch lines, as well as spells of hiccups and belches (borne of a regrettable fondness for gassy soft drinks like "Burpsi-Booma" and "Eleven Urp") which, at the aforementioned fee, usually bankrupted his unfortunate clients. He was aided by his lovely and meticulously efficient secretary, Miss Pennypacker.
 Silent Yokum: Prudent Cousin Silent never utters a word unless it's absolutely, vitally important. Consequently, he hadn't spoken in 40 years. The arrival of Silent's grim visage in Dogpatch signaled earthshaking news on the horizon. Capp would milk readers' suspense by having Silent "warm up" his rusty, creaking jaw muscles for a few days, before the momentous pronouncement.
 Happy Vermin: The "world's smartest cartoonist" — a caricature of Ham Fisher — who hired Li'l Abner to draw his comic strip for him in a dimly-lit closet. Instead of using Vermin's tired characters, Abner had inventively peopled the strip with hillbillies. A bighearted Vermin told his slaving assistant: "I'm proud of having created these characters!! They'll make millions for me!! And if they do — I'll get you a new light bulb!!"
 Big Stanislouse; aka Big Julius: Stanislouse was a brutal gangster with a childish fondness for kiddie TV superheroes (like "Chickensouperman" and "Milton the Masked Martian"). Part of a virtual goon squad of comic mobsters that inhabited Li'l Abner and Fearless Fosdick, the oafish Stanislouse alternated with other all-purpose underworld thugs, including "the Boys from the Syndicate" — Capp's euphemism for The Mob.
 The Square-Eyes Family: Mammy's revelatory encounter with these unpopular Dogpatch outcasts first appeared in 1956 as a thinly-veiled appeal for racial tolerance. It was later issued as an educational comic book — called Mammy Yokum and the Great Dogpatch Mystery! — by the Anti-Defamation League of B'nai B'rith.
 Appassionata Von Climax: One of a series of predatory, sexually aggressive sirens who pursued Li'l Abner prior to his marriage, and even afterward, much to the consternation of Daisy Mae. Joining a long list of dishy femmes fatales and spoiled debutantes that included Gloria Van Welbilt, Moonlight Sonata, Mimi Van Pett and "The Tigress"; Appassionata was memorably portrayed by both Tina Louise (onstage) and Stella Stevens (on film). Capp always wondered how he ever got her suggestive name past the censors.
 Tenderleif Ericson: Discovered frozen in the mud where her Viking ship sank in 1047, Tenderleif was Leif Ericson's beautiful, teenaged kid sister (complete with breastplate armor, Viking helmet and burlesque Norwegian accent). As soon as she saw Li'l Abner, however, she started warming up and breathing hard. "She's seventeen y'ars old", explains Mammy, "and she hain't had a date fo' nine hunnerd y'ars!"
 Princess Minihahaskirt: Decades before Disney's Pocahontas, the sexiest cartoon Indian princesses could be found in Li'l Abner. The most notable in a series of native maidens who enticed the normally stoic Lonesome Polecat, the list also included Minnie Mustache, Raving Dove, Little Turkey Wing and Princess Two Feathers.
 Liddle Noodnik: A typically miserable resident of perpetually frozen Lower Slobbovia, naked local waif Liddle Noodnik was usually employed to recite a farcical poem of greeting to visiting dignitaries, or sing the absurd Slobbovian national anthem (see "setting and fictitious locales"). Like many terms in Li'l Abner, Noodnik's name was derived from Yiddish. Nudnik is a slang term for a bothersome person or pest.
 Pantless Perkins: A very late addition to the strip, Capp introduced Honest Abe's brainy, ragamuffin pal Pantless Perkins in a series of kid-themed stories in the seventies, probably to compete with Peanuts. Pantless didn't own a single pair of trousers. He wore an over-length turtleneck sweater to hide the fact — much to his embarrassment. In one storyline, the nearest he ever got to a pair of pants was when he helps Honest Abe find a long-lost love of a millionaire in return for a pair of pants. Unfortunately, the prospective groom drops dead after tasting the terrible cooking of his bride-to-be, and Pantless remains so.
 Rotten Ralphie: The kiddie version of Earthquake McGoon, Ralphie lived up to his name as the Dogpatch neighborhood bully. Exceedingly large for his age, Ralphie always wore a cowboy outfit that was several sizes too small. In one storyline, after Ralphie beats up every boy in Dogpatch at the same time, he himself is beaten up when Pantless Perkins and Honest Abe trick Ralphie into getting into a fight with the Scragg boys of Skonk Hollow.
 Marcia Perkins: Innocent, outwardly normal teenager whose lips give off 451 °F of electromagnetic heat, frying the brain of any boy who kisses her. Declared a walking health hazard, Marcia wears a public warning sign ("Do Not Kiss This Girl, by Order of the Dept. of Health, Education and Welfare"). Her notoriety precedes her everywhere except Dogpatch, where she meets and falls for Tiny Yokum.
 Bet-a-Million Bashby: Bashby amassed his colossal fortune by following one simple rule: Always bet on a sure thing, and always bet with a fool. He hadn't reckoned on fool's luck, however. All through the years Bashby bet on sure things, and all through the years Abner won.
 The Widder Fruitful: Another iconic Dogpatch "regular", often glimpsed in passing or featured in crowd scenes. The ample, fertile widow invariably held three or four naked newborns under each arm, always carried backside forward, with a healthy brood of earlier offspring following in her wake.
 Loverboynik: In 1954, Capp sent a letter to Liberace addressing his intention to spoof him in Li'l Abner as "Liverachy". Liberace had his lawyers threaten to sue. Capp went ahead anyway, with a significant name change. Billed as the "Sweetheart of the Piano", Loverboynik is a blonde "dimpled darling" pianist and TV heartthrob. According to Capp, Liberace was "cut to the quick" when the parody appeared. Capp insisted that Loverboynik was not Liberace because Loverboynik "could play the piano rather decently and rarely wore black lace underwear."
 Rock Hustler: Unscrupulous publicity agent-turned-marketing mogul. He masterminds an ad campaign promoting the miracle diet food "Mockaroni", carefully neglecting to disclose that it's both addictive and lethal. "The more you crave, the more you eat. The more you eat, the thinner you get — until you (shudder!) float away..."
 Dumpington Van Lump: The bloated, almost catatonic heir to the Van Lump fortune, Dumpington can only utter one syllable ("Urp!") until he sets sight on Daisy Mae. A somewhat subhuman fiend, his favorite book is the disturbingly-titled How to Make Lampshades Out of Your Friends. Capp chose the Dumpington sequence to illustrate his lesson on continuity storytelling in the Famous Artists Cartoon Course.
 Sam the Centaur: A "mythical critter" with a classic, chiseled profile and Apollo-like blonde mane, Sam is a Greek centaur who occasionally roams the mountains of Dogpatch instead of the mountains of Thessaly. Available Jones, "th' most book-educated varmint in Dogpatch", pronounces: "He hain't real!"
 Jubilation T. Cornpone: Dogpatch's founder and most famous son, memorialized by a town statue, is Confederate General Jubilation T. Cornpone — renowned for "Cornpone's Retreat", "Cornpone's Disaster", "Cornpone's Stupidity", "Cornpone's Misjudgment", "Cornpone's Hoomiliation" and "Cornpone's Final Mistake". Cornpone was such a disastrously incompetent military leader that he came to be considered an important asset of the opposing side. According to the stage play, the statue was commissioned by a grateful Abraham Lincoln. Cornpone's only victories were posthumous — in one storyline, the General's statue is filled with Kickapoo Joy juice, which brings it to "life." It then goes on a rampage, beheading all the statues of Union Army generals. As the U.S. Army can't destroy it, since it's a National Monument, Kickapoo Joy Juice is poured into a Union statue which results in both statues charging one another. When the smoke clears, the animated statues have annihilated each other. At Mammy Yokum's urging the statue pieces are put back together with glue. The hapless general is really best known for being the namesake of the rousing musical number (a "showstopper") in the popular Li'l Abner musical, as sung by Marryin' Sam and chorus.
 Jubilation T. Cornpone Jr: son of General Cornpone. A former "commander" army mules, he became Commander of all U.N. Forces against Invaders from Outer Space, despite being described as the most incompetent general of all time. It later emerged he was given the job because no other General would take it. Cornpone fell in love with big-eyed "Princess Pocahauntingeyes" and lived with her in the land above the Dogpatch via the "Trashbean stalk", although he is later henpecked into submission.
 Romeo McHaystack: A would-be Don Juan of Pineapple Junction, whose attempts at romancing women are frustrated because the Civic Improvement League tattooed a warning about him on his forehead. Discouraged, he suddenly decides to romance Dogpatch women when he discovers that atomic waste is suspended above the town, casting it permanently in darkness.
 Sadie Hawkins: In the early days of Dogpatch, Sadie Hawkins was "the homeliest gal in them hills" who grew frantic waiting for suitors to come for her. Her father Hekzebiah Hawkins, a prominent Dogpatch resident, grew even more frantic about Sadie living at home for the rest of his life, and decreed the first annual Sadie Hawkins Day, a foot race in which all the unmarried women pursued the town's bachelors with matrimony as the consequence. A pseudo-holiday entirely created in the strip, it's still frequently observed today in the form of Sadie Hawkins dances, to which it is customary for women to ask men and at which women approach (or chase after) men.
 Lena the Hyena: A hideous Lower Slobbovian gal, referred to but initially unseen or only glimpsed from the neck down in Li'l Abner. Lena was so ugly that anyone who saw her was immediately driven insane. After weeks of teasing his readers by hiding Lena's face behind "censored" stickers and strategically placed dialogue balloons, Capp invited fans to draw Lena in a famous nationwide contest in 1946. Lena was ultimately revealed in the harrowing winning entry (as judged by Frank Sinatra, Boris Karloff and Salvador Dalí) drawn by noted cartoonist Basil Wolverton.
 Joanie Phoanie: An unabashed Communist radical and agitator, who sang revolutionary songs of class warfare (with burlesque titles like "Molotov Cocktails for Two") while hypocritically traveling via limousine and charging outrageous concert appearance fees to impoverished orphans. Joanie was Capp's parody of protest singer/songwriter Joan Baez. The character caused a storm of controversy in 1966, and many newspapers would only run censored versions of the strips. Baez took Capp's implicit satire to heart, however, as she would admit years later in her autobiography: "Mr Capp confused me considerably. I'm sorry he's not alive to read this, it would make him chuckle" (from And a Voice to Sing With: A Memoir, 1987).
 S.W.I.N.E.: Capp used Li'l Abner to satirize current events, fads, and ephemeral popular culture (such as zoot suits in "Zoot Suit Yokum", 1943). Beginning in the mid-1960s, the strip became a forum for Capp's increasingly conservative political views. Capp, who lived in Cambridge, Massachusetts, just a stone's throw from Harvard, satirized campus radicals, militant student political groups and hippies during the Vietnam War protest era. The Youth International Party (YIP) and Students for a Democratic Society (SDS) emerged in Li'l Abner as S.W.I.N.E. (Students Wildly Indignant about Nearly Everything).
 Al Capp claimed that he always strove to give incidental characters in Li'l Abner names that would render all further description unnecessary.  In that spirit, the following list of recurring semi-regulars (and a few one-shots) are unreferenced: Tobacco Rhoda, Joan L. Sullivan, Hamfat Gooch, Global McBlimp, Concertino Constipato, Jinx Rasputinburg, J. Sweetbody Goodpants, Reactionary J. Repugnant, B. Fowler McNest, Fleabrain, Stubborn P. Tolliver, Idiot J. Tolliver, Battling McNoodnik, Mayor Dan'l Dawgmeat, Slobberlips McJab, One-Fault Jones, Swami Riva, Olman Riva, Sir Orble Gasse-Payne, Black Rufe, Mickey Looney, "Ironpants" Bailey, Henry Cabbage Cod, Flash Boredom, Priceless and Liceless, Hopeless and Soapless, Disgustin' Jones, Skelton McCloset, Hawg McCall, "Good old" Bedly Damp, and a host of others.

Fearless Fosdick

Li'l Abner also featured a comic strip-within-the-strip: Fearless Fosdick was a parody of Chester Gould's plainclothes detective, Dick Tracy. It first appeared in 1942 and proved so popular that it ran intermittently in Li'l Abner over the next 35 years. Gould was also personally parodied in the series as cartoonist Lester Gooch — the diminutive, much-harassed and occasionally deranged "creator" of Fearless Fosdick. The style of the Fosdick sequences closely mimicked Tracy, including the urban setting, the outrageous villains, the galloping mortality rate, the crosshatched shadows, and the lettering style — even Gould's familiar signature was parodied in Fearless Fosdick.  Fosdick battled a succession of archenemies with absurdly unlikely names like Rattop, Anyface, Bombface, Boldfinger, the Atom Bum, the Chippendale Chair, and Sidney the Crooked Parrot, as well as his own criminal mastermind father, "Fearful" Fosdick (aka "The Original"). The razor-jawed title character (Li'l Abner's "ideel") was perpetually ventilated by flying bullets until he resembled a slice of Swiss cheese. The impervious Fosdick considered the gaping, smoking holes "mere scratches", however, and always reported back in one piece to his corrupt superior "The Chief" for duty the next day.

Besides being fearless, Fosdick was "pure, underpaid and purposeful", according to his creator. He also had notoriously bad aim — often leaving a trail of collateral damage (in the form of bullet-riddled pedestrians) in his wake. "When Fosdick is after a lawbreaker, there is no escape for the miscreant", Capp wrote in 1956. "There is, however, a fighting chance to escape for hundreds of innocent bystanders who happen to be in the neighborhood — but only a fighting chance. Fosdick's duty, as he sees it, is not so much to maintain safety as to destroy crime, and it's too much to ask any law-enforcement officer to do both, I suppose." Fosdick lived in squalor at the dilapidated boarding house run by his mercenary landlady, Mrs. Flintnose. He never married his own long-suffering fiancée Prudence Pimpleton (despite an engagement of 17 years), but Fosdick was directly responsible for the unwitting marriage of his biggest fan, Li'l Abner, to Daisy Mae in 1952. The bumbling detective became the star of his own NBC-TV puppet show that same year. Fosdick also achieved considerable exposure as the long-running advertising spokesman for Wildroot Cream-Oil, a popular men's hair product of the postwar period.

Setting and fictitious locales
Although ostensibly set in the Kentucky mountains, situations often took the characters to different destinations — including New York City, Washington, D.C., Hollywood, the South American Amazon, tropical islands, the Moon, Mars, etc. — as well as some purely fanciful worlds of Capp's imagination:

Dogpatch
Exceeding every burlesque stereotype of Appalachia, the impoverished backwater of Dogpatch consisted mostly of hopelessly ramshackle log cabins, "tarnip" fields, pine trees and "hawg" wallows. Most Dogpatchers were shiftless and ignorant; the remainder were scoundrels and thieves. The menfolk were too lazy to work, yet Dogpatch gals were desperate enough to chase them (see Sadie Hawkins Day). Those who farmed their turnip fields watched "turnip termites" swarm by the billions every year, locust-like, to devour Dogpatch's only crop (along with their homes, their livestock and all their clothing).

The local geography was fluid and vividly complex; Capp continually changed it to suit either his whims or the current storyline. Natural landmarks included (at various times) Teeterin' Rock, Onneccessary Mountain, Bottomless Canyon, and Kissin' Rock (handy to Suicide Cliff). Local attractions that reappeared in the strip included the West Po'k Chop Railroad; the "Skonk Works", a dilapidated factory located on the remote outskirts of Dogpatch; and the General Jubilation T. Cornpone memorial statue.

In one storyline Dogpatch's "Cannonball Express" train, after 1,563 tries, finally delivers its "cargo" to Dogpatch citizens on October 12, 1946, Receiving a 13-year stack of newspapers, Li'l Abner's family realizes that the Great Depression is on and that banks should close; they race to take their money out of the bank before realizing they have no money to begin with. Other news is the inauguration of Franklin Delano Roosevelt as president on March 4, 1933 (although Mammy Yokum thinks the President is Teddy Roosevelt), and a picture of Germany's "new leader" Adolf Hitler who claims to love peace while reviewing 20,000 new planes (April 21, 1933).

In the midst of the Great Depression, the hardscrabble residents of lowly Dogpatch allowed suffering Americans to laugh at yokels even worse off than themselves. In Al Capp's own words, Dogpatch was "an average stone-age community nestled in a bleak valley, between two cheap and uninteresting hills somewhere." Early in the continuity Capp a few times referred to Dogpatch being in Kentucky, but he was careful afterward to keep its location generic, probably to avoid cancellations from offended Kentucky newspapers. From then on, he referred to it as Dogpatch, USA, and did not give any specific location as to exactly where it was supposed to be located. Humorously enough, many states tried to claim ownership to the little town (Georgia, Tennessee, Alabama, etc.), yet Capp would not budge. He left it at Dogpatch USA so there would be no headaches and problems. Like the Coconino County depicted in George Herriman's Krazy Kat and the Okefenokee Swamp of Walt Kelly's Pogo, and, most recently and famously, The Simpsons "Springfield", Dogpatch's distinctive cartoon landscape became as identified with the strip as any of its characters. Later, Capp licensed and was part-owner of an  $35 million theme park called Dogpatch USA near Harrison, Arkansas.

Lower Slobbovia
As utterly wretched as existence was in Dogpatch, there was one place even worse. Frigid, faraway Lower Slobbovia was fashioned as a pointedly political satire of backward nations and foreign diplomacy, and remains a contemporary reference. Its hapless residents were perpetually waist-deep in several feet of snow, and icicles hung from almost every frostbitten nose. The favorite dish of the starving natives was raw polar bear (and vice versa). Lower Slobbovians spoke with burlesque pidgin-Russian accents; the miserable frozen wasteland of Capp's invention abounded in incongruous Yiddish humor.

Slobbovia is an iceberg, which (as real icebergs do) continually capsizes as its lower portions melt. This dunks Upper Slobbovia into Lower Slobbovia, and raises the latter into the former—a classic example of a literal revolution.

Lower Slobbovia and Dogpatch are both comic examples of modern dystopian satire. Conceptually based on Siberia, or perhaps specifically on Birobidzhan, Capp's icy hellhole made its first appearance in Li'l Abner in April 1946. Ruled by Good King Nogoodnik (sometimes known as King Stubbornovsky the Last), the Slobbovian politicians were even more corrupt than their Dogpatch counterparts. Their monetary unit was the "rasbucknik", of which one was worth nothing and a large quantity was worth a lot less, due to the trouble of carrying them around. The local children were read harrowing tales from "Ice-sop's Fables", which were parodies of classic Aesop Fables, but with a darkly sardonic bent (and titles like "Coldilocks and the Three Bares").

Other fictional locales
Other fictional locales included Skonk Hollow, El Passionato, Kigmyland, the Republic of Crumbumbo, Lo Kunning, Faminostan, Planets Pincus Number 2 and 7, Pineapple Junction and, most notably, the Valley of the Shmoon.

 Mythic creatures 
Li'l Abner featured a whole menagerie of allegorical animals over the years — each one was designed to satirically showcase another disturbing aspect of human nature. They included:
 Shmoos, introduced in 1948, were fabulous creatures that bred exponentially, consumed nothing, and eagerly provided everything that humankind could wish for. Besides producing both milk (bottled, grade A) and eggs (neatly packaged), they tasted like pork when roasted, chicken when fried, and steak when broiled. Ironically, the shmoo's generous nature and incredible usefulness made it a threat to capitalism, to western society and perhaps to civilization itself.
 Kigmies — Masochistic, aboriginal creatures who loved to be kicked, thereby satisfying all human aggression, up to a point, after which they went on a rampage of retaliation. (The Kigmy story was originally fashioned as a metaphor for racial and religious oppression. Capp's surviving preliminary sketches of the kigmies make this apparent, as detailed in the introductory notes to Li'l Abner Dailies 1949: Volume 15, Kitchen Sink Press, 1992).
 The Bald Iggle — A cute little wide-eyed, guileless creature whose soulful gaze compelled everyone to involuntarily tell the truth — including lawyers, politicians, fishermen, advertisers, husbands, wives and used car salesmen. The Iggle was officially declared a public menace by the FBI ("The life it ruins may be your own!"), and ultimately hunted down, confiscated and exterminated.
 Nogoodniks — or bad shmoos. Nogoodniks were a "sickly shade of green", had "li'l red eyes, sharp yaller teeth, an' a dirty look," and were the sworn enemies of "hoomanity". Frequently sporting 5 o'clock shadows, eye patches, scars, fangs and other ruffian attributes — they devoured "good" shmoos, and wreaked havoc on Dogpatch. They are finally defeated when they get subjected to George Jessel's recording of Paul Whiteman's "Wagon Wheels", a sound so excruciating that it kills them instantly. (Similar plot devices were used in the 1978 Attack of the Killer Tomatoes and 1996 Mars Attacks!.)
 Shminfants — Modified baby shmoos, which looked like human babies but were eternally young, came in a variety of different "colors", and never needed changing.
 Shtoonks — Imported from the Slobbovian embassy, Shtoonks were mean-spirited, sharp-toothed, hairy, flying creatures which were "not only sneaky, smelly and surly, but — yak! yak! — just try to eat one!!" Shtoonks had only one useful trait: they loved human misery so much that they actually enjoyed bringing bad news. They temporarily replaced postage stamps by delivering bills and other bad news for free.
 Mimikniks — Obsessive Slobbovian songbirds who sing like anyone they have ever heard. (Those who have heard Maria Callas are valued. Those who have heard George Jessel are shot.) The only song they know the words to is Short'nin' Bread, however, due to the fact that there was only one record in Lower Slobbovia.
 The Money Ha-Ha — An alien creature from "Planet Pincus No. 2", with ears shaped like taxi horns. It laid U.S. currency in place of eggs.
 Turnip Termites — Looking like a cross between a locust and a piranha, billions of these insatiable pests swarm once a year to their ancient feeding ground, Dogpatch.
 Shminks — Valued for making "shmink coats". They can only be captured by braining them with a kitchen door.
 Pincushions — Alien beings from "Planet Pincus No. 7". Like the earlier Moon Critters, they looked like flying sausages with pinwheels on their posteriors.
 Abominable Snow-Hams — Delectable but intelligent and sensitive beings, presenting Tiny Yokum with an ethical dilemma: if eating one constitutes cannibalism.
 The Slobbovian Amp-Eater — This luminous beast consumed electric currents; a walking energy crisis.
 Bashful Bulganiks — Timid birds that are so skittish they can not be seen by human eyes, and are thus theoretical.
 Stunflowers — Murderous, thoroughly malevolent anthropomorphic houseplants; anyone trying to pick their seeds ends up falling into Bottomless Canyon forever.
 Fatoceroses — The only defense against a stampede of these bloated pachyderms is a steaming plate of lethally addictive "Mockaroni".
 Bitingales — Small, fiendish devil birds whose hellish bite causes unbearable heat — for 24 years.
 The Slobbovian King Crab — A huge crustacean that only eats Slobbovian kings. Later supplemented by a marsupial called the Kingaroo, "which only eats [Slobbovian] kings"
 The Flapaloo — A scrawny, prehistoric bird that lays 1,000 eggs per minute. The eggs, when dissolved, turn water into gasoline. The Oil industry captures the last one in existence, and mercilessly wrings its neck.
 Gobbleglops — Looking like a cross between a hog and a teddy bear, these insatiable creatures eat rubbish (or as Mammy calls it, "glop"). They cannot be touched, as they are red-hot, living incinerators; waste goes in and nothing comes out. Mammy leads them to America's major polluted cities, where they obligingly devour all the garbage. But when the glop runs out — they begin to consume everything (and everyone) else in sight.
 Shmeagles — The world's most amorous creatures, they pursue their females at the speed of light — sometimes even faster.
 Hammus Alabammus — Faux Latin designation for an adorable (and delectable) species of swine, with a "zoot snoot" and a "drape shape". The only known femalein existence resides with the Yokums — their beloved pet, Salomey.

Dialogue and catchphrases
Al Capp, a native northeasterner, wrote all the final dialogue in Li'l Abner using his approximation of a mock-southern dialect (including phonetic sounds, eye dialect (nonstandard spelling for speech to draw attention to pronunciation), nonstop "creative" spelling and deliberate malapropisms). He constantly interspersed boldface type, and included prompt words in parentheses (chuckle!, sob!, gasp!, shudder!, smack!, drool!, cackle!, snort!, gulp!, blush!, ugh!, etc.) as asides, to bolster the effect of the printed speech balloons. Almost every line was followed by two exclamation marks for added emphasis.

Outside Dogpatch, characters used a variety of stock Vaudevillian dialects. Mobsters and criminal-types invariably spoke slangy Brooklynese, and residents of Lower Slobbovia spoke pidgin-Russian, with a smattering of Yinglish. Comic dialects were also devised for offbeat British characters — like H'Inspector Blugstone of Scotland Yard (who had a Cockney accent) and Sir Cecil Cesspool (whose speech was a clipped, uppercrust King's English). Various Asian, Latin, Native American and European characters spoke in a wide range of specific, broadly caricatured dialects as well. Capp has credited his inspiration for vividly stylized language to early literary influences like Charles Dickens, Mark Twain and Damon Runyon, as well as Old-time radio and the Burlesque stage.

Comics historian Don Markstein commented that Capp's "use of language was both unique and universally appealing; and his clean, bold cartooning style provided a perfect vehicle for his creations."

The following is a partial list of characteristic expressions that reappeared often in Li'l Abner:
 "Natcherly!"
 "Amoozin' but confoozin'!"
 "Yo' big, sloppy beast!!" (also, "Yo' mizzable skonk!!")
 "Ef Ah had mah druthers, Ah'd druther..."
 "As any fool kin plainly see!"  (Response: "Ah sees!")
 "What's good for General Bullmoose is good for everybody!" (Variant from the movie: "...good for the USA!")
 "Thar's no Jack S. like our Jack S!"
 "Oh, happy day!"
 "Th' ideel o' ev'ry one hunnerd percent, red-blooded American boy!"
 "Ah'll bash yore haid in!!"
 "Wal, fry mah hide!"  (also, "Wal, cuss mah bones!") Pappy Yokum utters this tagline when, thinking he is dreaming, actually commands a bottle genie to do his bidding. Awakening, he exclaims the phrase. "A wish is a wish," says the genie. The next comic frame says: HIDE FRIED
 "Ah has spoken!"
 "Good is better than evil becuz it's nicer!"
 "It hain't hoomin, thass whut it hain't!"

Toppers and alternate strips
Li'l Abner had several toppers on the Sunday page, including

 Washable Jones (February 24 – June 9, 1935)
 Advice fo' Chillun, aka Advice fo' Gals, Advice fo' Parents, Advice fo' Yo' All and other titles (June 23, 1935 – Aug 15, 1943)
 Small Change, aka Small Fry (May 31, 1942 – 1944)

The Sunday page debuted six months into the run of the strip. The first topper was Washable Jones, a weekly continuity about a four-year-old hillbilly boy who goes fishing and accidentally hooks a ghost, which he pulls from the water. After four months of fantasy adventure, Capp ended the strip with Washable's mother waking him up; the story was a dream. After this, Capp simply expanded Li'l Abner by another row, and filled the rest of the space with a page-wide title panel and a small panel called Advice fo' Chillun. Washable Jones later appeared in the strip in a Shmoo-related storyline in 1949, and he appeared with the Shmoos in two one-shot comics – Al Capp's Shmoo in Washable Jones' Travels (1950, a premium for Oxydol laundry detergent) and Washable Jones and the Shmoo #1 (1953, published by the Capp-owned publisher Toby Press).

Al Capp also wrote two other daily comic strips:

 Abbie an' Slats, drawn by Raeburn van Buren (Capp wrote the strip from July 12, 1937, through 1945: writing of the strip was continued by Capp's brother Elliot Caplin until the strip's demise on January 30, 1971)
 Long Sam, drawn by Bob Lubbers (Capp wrote the strip from May 31, 1954, through sometime in 1955; writing of the strip was continued by Elliot Caplin for a time, and then by Lubbers until the strip ended on December 29, 1962)

Licensing, advertising and promotion
Al Capp was a master of the arts of marketing and promotion. Publicity campaigns were devised to boost circulation and increase public visibility of Li'l Abner, often coordinating with national magazines, radio and television. In 1946 Capp persuaded six of the most popular radio personalities (Frank Sinatra, Kate Smith, Danny Kaye, Bob Hope, Fred Waring and Smilin' Jack Smith) to broadcast a song he'd written for Daisy Mae: (Li'l Abner) Don't Marry That Girl!! Other promotional tie-ins included the Lena the Hyena Contest (1946), the Name the Shmoo Contest (1949), the Nancy O. Contest (1951), the Roger the Lodger Contest (1964) and many others.

Capp also excelled at product endorsement, and Li'l Abner characters were often featured in mid-century American advertising campaigns. Dogpatch characters pitched consumer products as varied as Grape-Nuts cereal, Kraft caramels, Ivory soap, Oxydol, Duz and Dreft detergents, Fruit of the Loom, Orange Crush, Nestlé's cocoa, Cheney neckties, Pedigree pencils, Strunk chainsaws, U.S. Royal tires, Head & Shoulders shampoo and General Electric light bulbs. There were even Dogpatch-themed family restaurants called "Li'l Abner's" in Louisville, Kentucky, Morton Grove, Illinois, and Seattle, Washington.

Capp himself appeared in numerous print ads. A lifelong chain-smoker, he happily plugged Chesterfield cigarettes; he appeared in Schaeffer fountain pen ads with his friends Milton Caniff and Walt Kelly; pitched the Famous Artists School (in which he had a financial interest) along with Caniff, Rube Goldberg, Virgil Partch, Willard Mullin and Whitney Darrow, Jr; and, though a professed teetotaler, he personally endorsed Rheingold Beer, among other products.

 Cream of Wheat: Throughout the 1940s and 1950s, Li'l Abner was the spokesman for Cream of Wheat cereal in a long-running series of comic strip-format ads that appeared in national magazines including Life, Good Housekeeping, and Ladies' Home Journal. The ads usually featured Daisy Mae calling for "halp" against a threatening menace — in the person of Earthquake McGoon or, just as often, a gorilla, grizzly bear, rampaging moose, "Injun" attack, or some natural disaster like an avalanche, fire or flood. Abner is dispatched to rescue her, but not before enjoying a "dee-lishus" enriched bowl of hot Cream of Wheat which, the reader is assured, is "ready in just 5 minutes!"
 Wildroot Cream-Oil: Fearless Fosdick was licensed for use in an advertising campaign for Wildroot Cream-Oil, a popular men's hair tonic. Fosdick's iconic profile on tin signs and advertising displays became a prominent fixture in barbershops across America — advising readers to "Get Wildroot Cream-Oil, Charlie!" A series of ads appeared in newspapers, magazines and comic books featuring Fosdick's farcical battles with "Anyface" — a murderous master of disguise. (Anyface was always given away by his telltale dandruff and messy hair, however.)
 Toys and licensed merchandise: Dogpatch characters were heavily licensed throughout the 1940s and 1950s: the main cast was produced as a set of six hand puppets and  dolls by Baby Barry Toys in 1957. A 10-figure set of carnival chalkware statues of Dogpatch characters was manufactured by Artrix Products in 1951, and Topstone introduced a line of 16 rubber Halloween masks prior to 1960. Licensing would reach an apex, however, with the unexpected postwar merchandising phenomenon that followed Capp's introduction of the Shmoo. As in the strip, shmoos suddenly appeared to be everywhere in 1948 and 1949. A garment factory in Baltimore turned out a whole line of shmoo apparel — including "Shmooveralls". Shmoo dolls, clocks, watches, jewelry, earmuffs, wallpaper, fishing lures, air fresheners, soap, ice cream, balloons, ashtrays, comic books, records, sheet music, toys, games, Halloween masks, salt and pepper shakers, decals, pinbacks, tumblers, coin banks, greeting cards, planters, neckties, suspenders, belts, curtains, fountain pens, and other shmoo paraphernalia were produced. In a single year, shmoo merchandise generated over $25 million in sales. Close to a hundred licensed shmoo products from 75 different manufacturers were produced, some of which sold five million units each. More recently, Dark Horse Comics issued four figures of Abner, Daisy Mae, Fosdick and the Shmoo in 2000 as part of their line of Classic Comic Characters — statues #8, 9, 17 and 31, respectively.
 Kickapoo Joy Juice: The lethal brew known as Kickapoo Joy Juice, featured in the strip and characterized as moonshine or bootleg liquor (it could also remove hair, paint and tattoos) has been a licensed brand in real-life since 1965. The National NuGrape Company first produced the beverage, which was acquired in 1968 by the Moxie Company, and eventually the Monarch Beverage Company of Atlanta, Georgia. As with Mountain Dew, another euphemism for moonshine, the actual product is a soft drink. To this day, the label features Capp's characters Hairless Joe and Lonesome Polecat. Distribution currently includes the United States, Canada, Singapore, Bangladesh, China, Pakistan, Malaysia, Mongolia, Brunei, Indonesia and Thailand.
 Dogpatch USA: In 1968, an  $35 million theme park called Dogpatch USA opened at Marble Falls, Arkansas, based on Capp's work and with his support. The gift shops sold "hillbilly" souvenirs like corncob pipes and moonshine jugs. In addition to the newly constructed rides and attractions, many of the buildings in the park were authentic 19th-century log structures purchased by general manager James H. Schermerhorn. The logs in each building were numbered, cataloged, disassembled and reassembled at the park. Dogpatch USA was a popular attraction during the 1970s, but was closed in 1993 due to mismanagement and financial difficulties. Several attempts have been made to reopen the park but at present it lies abandoned. As of late 2005, the area once devoted to a live-action facsimile of Dogpatch (including a lifesize statue in the town square of Dogpatch "founder" Jubilation T. Cornpone) has been heavily stripped by vandals and souvenir hunters, and is today slowly being reclaimed by the surrounding Arkansas wilderness.  It was announced that Dogpatch will reopen as Heritage USA in October 2018.

Awards and recognition

Fans of the strip ranged from novelist John Steinbeck, who called Capp "very possibly the best writer in the world today" in 1953, and even earnestly recommended him for the Nobel Prize in literature — to media critic and theorist Marshall McLuhan, who considered Capp "the only robust satirical force in American life." John Updike, calling Li'l Abner a "hillbilly Candide", added that the strip's "richness of social and philosophical commentary approached the Voltairean." Capp has been compared, at various times, to Fyodor Dostoevsky, Jonathan Swift, Lawrence Sterne, and Rabelais. Journalism Quarterly and Time have both called him "the Mark Twain of cartoonists". Charlie Chaplin, William F. Buckley, Al Hirschfeld, Harpo Marx, Russ Meyer, John Kenneth Galbraith, Ralph Bakshi, Shel Silverstein, Hugh Downs, Gene Shalit, Frank Cho, Daniel Clowes and (reportedly) even Queen Elizabeth have confessed to being fans of Li'l Abner.

In his seminal book Understanding Media, Marshall McLuhan considered Li'l Abner's Dogpatch "a paradigm of the human situation". Comparing Capp to other contemporary humorists, McLuhan once wrote: "Arno, Nash, and Thurber are brittle, wistful little précieux beside Capp!" In his essay "The Decline of the Comics", (Canadian Forum, January 1954) literary critic Hugh MacLean classified American comic strips into four types: daily gag, adventure, soap opera, and "an almost lost comic ideal: the disinterested comment on life's pattern and meaning." In the fourth type, according to MacLean, there were only two: Pogo and Li'l Abner. In 2002 the Chicago Tribune, in a review of The Short Life and Happy Times of the Shmoo, noted: "The wry, ornery, brilliantly perceptive satirist will go down as one of the Great American Humorists." In America's Great Comic Strip Artists (1997), comics historian Richard Marschall analyzed the overtly misanthropic subtext of Li'l Abner:

Li'l Abner was also the subject of the first book-length, scholarly assessment of a comic strip ever published. Li'l Abner: A Study in American Satire by Arthur Asa Berger (Twayne, 1969) contained serious analyses of Capp's narrative technique, his use of dialogue, self-caricature and grotesquerie, the strip's overall place in American satire, and the significance of social criticism and the graphic image. "One of the few strips ever taken seriously by students of American culture," wrote Professor Berger, "Li'l Abner is worth studying...because of Capp's imagination and artistry, and because of the strip's very obvious social relevance." It was reprinted by the University Press of Mississippi in 1994.

Al Capp's life and career are the subjects of a new life-sized mural commemorating his 100th birthday, displayed in downtown Amesbury, Massachusetts.Amesbury Gives Li'l Abner His Due Boston Globe May 15, 2010 According to the Boston Globe (as reported on May 18, 2010), the town has renamed its amphitheater in the artist's honor, and is looking to develop an Al Capp Museum. Capp is also the subject of an upcoming PBS American Masters documentary produced by his granddaughter, independent filmmaker Caitlin Manning.

 National Cartoonists Society Reuben Award (1947) for "Cartoonist of the Year".
 Inkpot Award (1978) bestowed by Comic-Con International.
 National Cartoonists Society Elzie Segar Award (1979) for a "unique and outstanding contribution to the profession of cartooning."
 Al Capp, an inductee into the National Cartoon Museum (formerly the International Museum of Cartoon Art), is one of only 31 artists honored by inclusion into their Hall of Fame.
 Al Capp was inducted into the Will Eisner Award Hall of Fame in 2004.
 "Neither the strip's shifting political leanings nor the slide of its final few years had any bearing on its status as a classic; and in 1995, it was recognized as such by the U.S. Postal Service. Li'l Abner was one of 20 American comic strips included in the Comic Strip Classics series of USPS commemorative stamps.

Influence and legacy

Sadie Hawkins Day
An American folk event, Sadie Hawkins Day is a pseudo-holiday entirely created within the strip. It made its debut in Li'l Abner on November 15, 1937. Capp originally created it as a comic plot device, but in 1939, only two years after its inauguration, a double-page spread in Life proclaimed, "On Sadie Hawkins Day Girls Chase Boys in 201 Colleges". By the early 1940s the comic strip event had swept the nation's imagination and acquired a life of its own. By 1952, the event was reportedly celebrated at 40,000 known venues. It became a woman-empowering rite at high schools and college campuses, long before the modern feminist movement gained prominence.

Outside the comic strip, the practical basis of a Sadie Hawkins dance is simply one of gender role-reversal. Women and girls take the initiative in inviting the man or boy of their choice out on a date — almost unheard of before 1937 — typically to a dance attended by other bachelors and their assertive dates. When Capp created the event, it wasn't his intention to have it occur annually on a specific date, because it inhibited his freewheeling plotting. However, due to its enormous popularity and the numerous fan letters he received, Capp made it a tradition in the strip every November, lasting four decades. In many localities, the tradition continues.

Al Capp ended his comic strip with the final gesture of setting a date for Sadie Hawkins Day. In his November 5, 1977 strip, Li'l Abner and Daisy Mae make a final visit to Capp, and Daisy insisted the Capp settle on a date. Capp suggests November 26, and Daisy rewarded him with a kiss.

Additions to the language
Sadie Hawkins Day and Sadie Hawkins dance are two of several terms attributed to Al Capp that have entered the English language. Others include double whammy, skunk works and Lower Slobbovia. The term shmoo has also entered the lexicon — used in defining highly technical concepts in no fewer than four separate fields of science.

 In socioeconomics, a "shmoo" refers to any generic kind of good that reproduces itself (as opposed to "widgets" which require resources and active production).
 In microbiology, "shmooing" is the biological term used for the "budding" process in yeast reproduction. The cellular bulge produced by a haploid yeast cell towards a cell of the opposite mating type during the mating of yeast is referred to as a "shmoo", due to its structural resemblance to the cartoon character.
 In the field of particle physics, "shmoo" refers to a high-energy survey instrument – as utilized at the Los Alamos National Laboratory for the Cygnus X-3 Sky Survey performed at the LAMPF (Los Alamos Meson Physics Facility) grounds. Over one hundred white "shmoo" detectors were at one time sprinkled around the accelerator beamstop area and adjacent mesa to capture subatomic cosmic ray particles emitted from the constellation Cygnus. The detectors housed scintillators and photomultipliers in an array that gave the detector its distinctive shmoo shape.
 In electrical engineering, a shmoo plot is the technical term used for the graphic pattern of test circuits. (The term is also used as a verb: to "shmoo" means to run the test.)

Capp has also been credited with popularizing many terms, such as "natcherly", schmooze, druthers, and nogoodnik, neatnik, etc. (In his book The American Language, H.L. Mencken credits the postwar mania for adding "-nik" to the ends of adjectives to create nouns as beginning — not with beatnik or Sputnik, but earlier — in the pages of Li'l Abner.)

Franchise ownership and creators' rights
In the late 1940s, newspaper syndicates typically owned the copyrights, trademarks and licensing rights to comic strips. "Capp was an aggressive and fearless businessman," according to publisher Denis Kitchen.  "Nearly all comic strips, even today, are owned and controlled by syndicates, not the strips' creators. And virtually all cartoonists remain content with their diluted share of any merchandising revenue their syndicates arrange. When the starving and broke Capp first sold Li'l Abner in 1934, he gladly accepted the syndicate's standard onerous contract. But in 1947 Capp sued United Feature Syndicate for $14 million, publicly embarrassed UFS in Li'l Abner, and wrested ownership and control of his creation the following year."

In October 1947, Li'l Abner met Rockwell P. Squeezeblood, head of the abusive and corrupt Squeezeblood Syndicate, a thinly veiled dig at UFS. The resulting sequence, "Jack Jawbreaker Fights Crime!!", was a devastating satire of Jerry Siegel and Joe Shuster's notorious exploitation by DC Comics over Superman (see above excerpt). It was later reprinted in The World of Li'l Abner (1953).

In 1964, Capp left United Features and took Li'l Abner to the Chicago Tribune New York News Syndicate.

Integration of women in the NCS
Al Capp was an outspoken pioneer in favor of diversifying the National Cartoonists Society by admitting women cartoonists. The NCS had originally disallowed female members into its ranks. In 1949, when the all-male club refused membership to Hilda Terry, creator of the comic strip Teena, Capp temporarily resigned in protest. "Capp had always advocated a more activist agenda for the Society, and he had begun in December 1949 to make his case in the Newsletter as well as at the meetings," wrote comics historian R. C. Harvey. According to Tom Roberts, author of Alex Raymond: His Life and Art (2007), Capp authored a stirring monologue that was instrumental in changing the restrictive rules the following year. Hilda Terry was the first woman cartoonist to break the gender barrier when the NCS finally permitted female members in 1950.

Social commentary in comic strips
Through Li'l Abner, the American comic strip achieved unprecedented relevance in the postwar years, attracting new readers who were more intellectual, more informed on current events, and less likely to read the comics (according to Coulton Waugh, author of The Comics, 1947). "When Li'l Abner made its debut in 1934, the vast majority of comic strips were designed chiefly to amuse or thrill their readers. Capp turned that world upside-down by routinely injecting politics and social commentary into Li'l Abner," wrote comics historian Rick Marschall in America's Great Comic Strip Artists (1989). With adult readers far outnumbering juveniles, Li'l Abner forever cleared away the concept that humor strips were solely the domain of adolescents and children. Li'l Abner provided a whole new template for contemporary satire and personal expression in comics, paving the way for Pogo, Feiffer, Doonesbury and MAD.

Mad
Fearless Fosdick and other Li'l Abner comic strip parodies, such as "Jack Jawbreaker!" (1947) and "Little Fanny Gooney" (1952), were almost certainly an inspiration to Harvey Kurtzman when he created his irreverent Mad, which began in 1952 as a comic book that specifically parodied other comics in the same subversive manner. By the time EC Comics published Mad #1, Capp had been doing Fearless Fosdick for nearly a decade. Similarities between Li'l Abner and the early Mad include the incongruous use of mock-Yiddish slang terms, the nose-thumbing disdain for pop culture icons, the rampant black humor, the dearth of sentiment and the broad visual styling. Even the trademark comic "signs" that clutter the backgrounds of Will Elder's panels had a precedent in Li'l Abner, in the residence of Dogpatch entrepreneur Available Jones, though they're also reminiscent of Bill Holman's Smokey Stover. Tellingly, Kurtzman resisted doing feature parodies of either Li'l Abner or Dick Tracy in the comic book Mad, despite their prominence.

Parodies and imitations
Al Capp once told one of his assistants that he knew Li'l Abner had finally "arrived" when it was first pirated as a pornographic Tijuana bible parody in the mid-1930s. Li'l Abner was also parodied in 1954 (as "Li'l Melvin" by "Ol' Hatt") in the pages of EC Comics' humor comic, Panic, edited by Al Feldstein. Kurtzman eventually did spoof Li'l Abner (as "Li'l Ab'r") in 1957, in his short-lived humor magazine, Trump. Both the Trump and Panic parodies were drawn by EC legend, Will Elder. In 1947, Will Eisner's The Spirit satirized the comic strip business in general, as a denizen of Central City tries to murder cartoonist "Al Slapp", creator of "Li'l Adam". Capp was also caricatured as an ill-mannered, boozy cartoonist (Capp was a teetotaler in real life) named "Hal Rapp" in the comic strip Mary Worth by Allen Saunders and Ken Ernst. Supposedly done in retaliation for Capp's "Mary Worm" parody in Li'l Abner (1956), a media-fed "feud" commenced briefly between the rival strips. It all turned out to be a collaborative hoax, however — cooked up by Capp and his longtime pal Saunders as an elaborate publicity stunt.

Li'l Abners success also sparked a handful of comic strip imitators. Jasper Jooks by Jess "Baldy" Benton (1948–'49), Ozark Ike (1945–'53) and Cotton Woods (1955–'58), both by Ray Gotto, were clearly inspired by Capp's strip. Boody Rogers' Babe was a peculiar series of comic books about a beautiful hillbilly girl who lived with her kin in the Ozarks — with many similarities to Li'l Abner. A derivative hillbilly feature called Looie Lazybones, an out-and-out imitation (drawn by a young Frank Frazetta) ran in several issues of Standard's Thrilling Comics in the late 1940s. Charlton published the short-lived Hillbilly Comics by Art Gates in 1955, featuring "Gumbo Galahad", who was a dead ringer for Li'l Abner, as was Pokey Oakey by Don Dean, which ran in MLJ's Top-Notch Laugh and Pep Comics. Later, many fans and critics saw Paul Henning's popular TV sitcom, The Beverly Hillbillies (1962–'71) as owing much of its inspiration to Li'l Abner, prompting Alvin Toffler to ask Capp about the similarities in a 1965 Playboy interview.

Popularity and production

Li'l Abner made its debut on August 13, 1934, in eight North American newspapers, including the New York Mirror. Initially owned and syndicated through United Feature Syndicate, a division of the E.W. Scripps Company, it was an immediate success. According to publisher Denis Kitchen, Capp's "hapless Dogpatchers hit a nerve in Depression-era America. Within three years Abner's circulation climbed to 253 newspapers, reaching over 15,000,000 readers. Before long he was in hundreds more, with a total readership exceeding 60,000,000." At its peak, the strip was read daily by 70 million Americans (when the U.S. population was only 180 million), with a circulation of more than 900 newspapers in North America and Europe.

During the extended peak of the strip, the workload grew to include advertising, merchandising, promotional work, comic book adaptations, public service material and other specialty work — in addition to the regular six dailies and one Sunday strip per week. Capp had a platoon of assistants in later years, who worked under his direct supervision. They included Andy Amato, Harvey Curtis, Walter Johnson and, notably, a young Frank Frazetta, who penciled the Sunday continuity from studio roughs from 1954 to the end of 1961 — before his fame as a fantasy artist.

Sensitive to his own experience working on Joe Palooka, Capp frequently drew attention to his assistants in interviews and publicity pieces. A 1950 cover story in Time even included photos of two of his employees, whose roles in the production were detailed by Capp. Ironically, this highly irregular policy has led to the misconception that his strip was "ghosted" by other hands. The production of Li'l Abner has been well documented, however. In point of fact, Capp maintained creative control over every stage of production for virtually the entire run of the strip. Capp himself originated the stories, wrote the dialogue, designed the major characters, rough penciled the preliminary staging and action of each panel, oversaw the finished pencils, and drew and inked the faces and hands of the characters. "He had the touch," Frazetta said of Capp in 2008. "He knew how to take an otherwise ordinary drawing and really make it pop. I'll never knock his talent."

Li'l Abner lasted until November 13, 1977, when Capp retired with an apology to his fans for the recently declining quality of the strip, which he said had been the best he could manage due to advancing illness. "If you have any sense of humor about your strip — and I had a sense of humor about mine — you knew that for three or four years Abner was wrong. Oh hell, it's like a fighter retiring. I stayed on longer than I should have," he admitted.  "When he retired Li'l Abner, newspapers ran expansive articles and television commentators talked about the passing of an era. People magazine ran a substantial feature, and even the comics-free New York Times devoted nearly a full page to the event," according to publisher Denis Kitchen. Capp, a lifelong chain smoker, died from emphysema two years later at age 70, at his home in South Hampton, New Hampshire, on November 5, 1979.

In 1988 and 1989 many newspapers ran reruns of Li'l Abner episodes, mostly from the 1940s run, distributed by Newspaper Enterprise Association and Capp Enterprises. Following the 1989 revival of the Pogo comic strip, a revival of Li'l Abner was also planned in 1990. Drawn by cartoonist Steve Stiles, the new Abner was approved by Capp's widow, and brother Elliott Caplin, but Al Capp's daughter, Julie Capp, objected at the last minute and permission was withdrawn.

Li'l Abner in other media

Radio and recordings
With John Hodiak in the title role, the Li'l Abner radio serial ran weekdays on NBC from Chicago, from November 20, 1939, to December 6, 1940. Rounding out the cast were soap opera star Laurette Fillbrandt as Daisy Mae, Hazel Dopheide as Mammy Yokum, and Clarence Hartzell (who was also a prominent actor on Vic and Sade) as Pappy. Durward Kirby was the announcer. The radio show was not written by Al Capp — but by Charles Gussman. However, Gussman consulted closely with Capp on the storylines. (A familiar radio personality, Capp was frequently heard on the NBC broadcast series, Monitor. He also briefly filled-in for radio journalist Drew Pearson, participated in a March 2, 1948 America's Town Meeting of the Air debate on ABC, and hosted his own syndicated, 500-station radio show.)

 The Shmoo Sings with Earl Rogers — 78 rpm (1948) Allegro
 The Shmoo Club b/w The Shmoo Is Clean, the Shmoo Is Neat — 45 rpm (1949) Music You Enjoy, Inc.
 The Snuggable, Huggable Shmoo b/w The Shmoo Doesn't Cost a Cent — 45 rpm (1949) Music You Enjoy, Inc.
 Shmoo Lesson b/w A Shmoo Can Do Most Anything — 45 rpm (1949) Music You Enjoy, Inc.
 Li'l Abner Goes to Town — 78 rpm (1950) Capp-Tone Comic Record
 Li'l Abner (Original Cast Recording) — LP (1956) Columbia
 Li'l Abner (Motion Picture Soundtrack) — LP (1959) Columbia
 An Interview with Al Capp — EP (1959) Smithsonian Folkways
 Li'l Abner fo' Chillun — LP (c. 1960) 20th FOX
 Al Capp on Campus — LP (1969) Jubilee

Selections from the Li'l Abner musical score have been recorded by everyone from Percy Faith and Mario Lanza to André Previn and Shelly Manne. Over the years, Li'l Abner characters have inspired diverse compositions in pop, jazz, country and even rock 'n' roll:

 The Kickapoo Joy Juice Jolt (1946) from The Li'l Abner Suite, was composed for The Alvino Rey Orchestra by Bud Estes.
 Kickapoo Joy Juice, composed by Duke Ellington, was recorded live at Carnegie Hall in December, 1947.
 Lonesome Polecat, written by Johnny Mercer & Gene de Paul for the musical Seven Brides for Seven Brothers (1954), was later recorded by Bobby Darin and the McGuire Sisters.
 Fearless Fosdick, composed by Bill Holman, was recorded live in 1954 by Vic Lewis and his Orchestra, featuring Tubby Hayes.
 Daisy Mae, written and recorded by Ernest Tubb, appeared on the Decca album The Daddy of 'Em All (1957).
 Kickapoo Joy Juice (1962) written by Jack Greenback, Mel Larson & Jerry Marcellino, was recorded by The Rivingtons.
 Sadie Hawkins Dance (2001) written by Matt Thiessen, was recorded by Relient K.
 Fearless Fosdick's Tune, composed and recorded by Umberto Fiorentino, appeared on the Brave Art/Columbia-Sony CD Things to Come (2002).

Sheet music
 Li'l Abner — by Ben Oakland, Milton Berle & Milton Drake (1940) Leo Feist Publishers
 Sadie Hawkins Day — by Don Raye & Hughie Prince (1940) Leeds Music Corp.
 The USA by Day and the RAF by Night — by Hal Block & Bob Musel (1944) Paramount Music Corp.
 (Li'l Abner) Don't Marry That Girl!! — by Al Capp & Sam H. Stept (1946) Barton Music Corp.
 The Shmoo Song — by John Jacob Loeb & Jule Styne (1948) Harvey Music Corp.
 Shmoo Songs — by Gerald Marks (1949) Bristol Music Corp.
 The Kigmy Song — by Joe Rosenfield & Fay Tishman (1949) Town and Country Music Co.
 I'm Lonesome and Disgusted!!! — by "Irving Vermyn" [Al Capp, Bob Lubbers & Dave Lambert] (1956) General Music Publishing Co.
 Namely You — by Johnny Mercer & Gene de Paul (1956) Commander Publications
 Love in a Home — by Johnny Mercer & Gene de Paul (1956) Commander Publications
 If I Had My Druthers — by Johnny Mercer & Gene de Paul (1956) Commander Publications
 Jubilation T. Cornpone — by Johnny Mercer & Gene de Paul (1956) Commander Publications

Comic books and reprints
 Tip Top Comics (1936–1948) anthology (United Feature Syndicate)
 Comics on Parade (1945–1946) anthology (UFS)
 Sparkler Comics (1946–1948) anthology (UFS)
 Li'l Abner (1947) 9 issues (Harvey Comics)
 Li'l Abner (1948) 3 issues (Super Publishing)
 Tip Topper Comics (1949–1954) anthology (UFS)
 Al Capp's Li'l Abner (1949–1955) 28 issues (Toby)
 Al Capp's Shmoo Comics (1949–1950) 5 issues (Toby)
 Al Capp's Dogpatch (1949) 4 issues (Toby)
 Al Capp's Li'l Abner in The Mystery o' the Cave (1950) (Oxydol premium)
 Al Capp's Daisy Mae in Ham Sangwidges (1950) (Oxydol premium)
 Al Capp's Shmoo in Washable Jones' Travels (1950) (Oxydol premium)
 Al Capp's Wolf Gal (1951–1952) 2 issues (Toby)
 Washable Jones and the Shmoo (1953) (Toby)
 Party Time with Coke (1958) monthly digest featuring Al Capp's Boys 'n' Gals (Coca-Cola premium)

No comprehensive reprint of the series had been attempted until Kitchen Sink Press began publishing the Li'l Abner Dailies in hardcover and paperback, one year per volume, in 1988. The demise of KSP in 1999 stopped the reprint series at Volume 27 (1961). More recently, Dark Horse Comics reprinted the limited series Al Capp's Li'l Abner: The Frazetta Years, in four full-color volumes covering the Sunday pages from 1954 to 1961. They also released an archive hardcover reprint of the complete Shmoo Comics in 2009, followed by a second Shmoo volume of complete newspaper strips in 2011.

At the San Diego Comic Con in July 2009, IDW and The Library of American Comics announced the upcoming publication of Al Capp's Li'l Abner: The Complete Dailies and Color Sundays: Vol. 1 (1934–1936). The comprehensive series titled Li'l Abner: The Complete Dailies & Color Sundays, is planned to be a reprinting of the complete 43-year history of Li'l Abner spanning a projected 20 volumes, began on April 7, 2010.

Public service works
Capp provided specialty artwork for civic groups, government agencies and charitable or non-profit organizations, spanning several decades. The following titles are all single-issue, educational comic books and pamphlets produced for various public services:

 Al Capp by Li'l Abner — public service giveaway issued by the Red Cross (1946)
 Yo' Bets Yo' Life! — public service giveaway issued by the U.S. Army (circa 1950)
 Li'l Abner Joins the Navy — public service giveaway issued by the Dept. of the Navy (1950)
 Fearless Fosdick and the Case of the Red Feather — public service giveaway issued by Red Feather Services, a forerunner of United Way (1951)
 The Youth You Supervise — public service giveaway issued by the U.S. Department of Labor (1956)
 Mammy Yokum and the Great Dogpatch Mystery! — public service giveaway issued by the Anti-Defamation League of B'nai B'rith (1956)
 Operation: Survival! — public service giveaway issued by the Dept. of Civil Defense (1957)
 Natural Disasters! — public service giveaway issued by the Dept. of Civil Defense (1957)
 Martin Luther King and the Montgomery Story — public service giveaway issued by The Fellowship of Reconciliation (1958)
 Li'l Abner and the Creatures from Drop-Outer Space — public service giveaway issued by the Job Corps (1965)

In addition, Dogpatch characters were used in national campaigns for the U.S. Treasury, the Cancer Foundation, the March of Dimes, the National Heart Fund, the Sister Kenny Foundation, the Boy Scouts of America, Community Chest, the National Reading Council, Minnesota Tuberculosis and Health Association, Christmas Seals, the National Amputation Foundation and Disabled American Veterans, among others.

Animation and puppetry
Beginning in 1944, Li'l Abner was adapted into a series of color theatrical cartoons by Screen Gems for Columbia Pictures, directed by Sid Marcus, Bob Wickersham and Howard Swift. The five titles were: Amoozin But Confoozin, Sadie Hawkins Day, A Peekoolyar Sitcheeyshun, Porkuliar Piggy and Kickapoo Juice. Al Capp was reportedly not pleased with the results, and the series was discontinued after five shorts. The character was voiced by Frank Graham.

Evil-Eye Fleegle and his "whammy" make an animated cameo appearance in the U.S. Armed Forces Special Weapons Project training film, Self Preservation in an Atomic Attack (1950). Lena the Hyena makes a brief animated appearance in Who Framed Roger Rabbit (1988).

In 1952, Fearless Fosdick proved popular enough to be incorporated into a short-lived TV series. The ambitious puppet show was created and directed by puppeteer Mary Chase, written by Everett Crosby and voiced by John Griggs, Gilbert Mack and Jean Carson. Fearless Fosdick premiered on Sunday afternoons on NBC; 13 episodes featuring the Mary Chase marionettes were produced.  The storylines and villains were mostly separate from the comic strip and unique to the show. Among the original TV characters were "Mr. Ditto", "Harris Tweed" (a disembodied suit of clothes), "Swenn Golly" (a Svengali-like mesmerist), counterfeiters "Max Millions" and "Minton Mooney", "Frank N. Stein", "Batula", "Match Head" (a pyromaniac), "Sen-Sen O'Toole", "Shmoozer" and "Herman the Ape Man".

Shmoos were originally meant to be included in the 1956 Broadway Li'l Abner musical, employing stage puppetry. The idea was reportedly abandoned in the development stage by the producers, however, for reasons of practicality. After Capp's death, the Shmoo was used in two Hanna-Barbera produced Saturday morning cartoon series for TV. First in the 1979 The New Shmoo (later incorporated into Fred and Barney Meet the Shmoo), and again from 1980 to 1981 in the Flintstone Comedy Show, in the Bedrock Cops segments.

Stage, film and television
The first Li'l Abner movie was made at RKO Radio Pictures in 1940, starring Jeff York (credited as Granville Owen), Martha O'Driscoll, Mona Ray and Johnnie Morris. Although it lacks the political satire and Broadway polish of the 1959 version, this film gives a fairly accurate portrayal of the various Dogpatch characters up until that time. Of particular note is the appearance of Buster Keaton as Lonesome Polecat, and a title song with lyrics by Milton Berle. Other familiar silent comedy veterans in the cast include Bud Jamison, Lucien Littlefield, Johnny Arthur, Mickey Daniels, and ex-Keystone Cops Chester Conklin, Edgar Kennedy and Al St. John. The story concerns Daisy Mae's efforts to catch Li'l Abner on Sadie Hawkins Day. Since this movie predates their comic strip marriage, Abner makes a last-minute escape (natcherly!)

A much more successful musical comedy adaptation of the strip, also entitled Li'l Abner, opened on Broadway at the St. James Theater on November 15, 1956, and had a long run of 693 performances, followed by a nationwide tour. Among the actors originally considered for the title role were Dick Shawn and Andy Griffith. The stage musical, with music and lyrics by Gene de Paul and Johnny Mercer, was adapted into a Technicolor motion picture at Paramount in 1959 by producer Norman Panama and director Melvin Frank, with an original score by Nelson Riddle.DVD Verdict review 4/25/2005: Li'l Abner  Starring Peter Palmer, Leslie Parrish, Julie Newmar, Stella Stevens, Stubby Kaye, Billie Hayes, Howard St. John, Joe E. Marks, Carmen Alvarez, William Lanteau and Bern Hoffman, with cameos by Jerry Lewis, Robert Strauss, Ted Thurston, Alan Carney, Valerie Harper and Donna Douglas. Three members of the original Broadway cast did not appear in the film version: Charlotte Rae (who was replaced by Billie Hayes early in the stage production), Edie Adams (who was pregnant during the filming) and Tina Louise. The musical has since become a perennial favorite of high school and amateur productions, due to its popular appeal and modest production requirements.

Li'l Abner never sold as a TV series despite several attempts (including an unsold pilot that aired once on NBC on September 5, 1967), but Al Capp was a familiar face on television for twenty years. No other cartoonist to date has come close to Capp's televised exposure. Capp appeared as a regular on The Author Meets the Critics. He was also a periodic panelist on ABC and NBC's Who Said That? Capp has appeared as himself on The Ed Sullivan Show, Sid Caesar's Your Show of Shows, The Today Show, The Red Skelton Show, The Merv Griffin Show, The Mike Douglas Show, and on This Is Your Life on February 12, 1961, with host Ralph Edwards and honoree Peter Palmer. He hosted at least five television programs between 1952 and 1972 — three different talk shows called The Al Capp Show (twice), Al Capp, Al Capp's America (a live "chalk talk", with Capp providing a barbed commentary while sketching cartoons), and a game show called Anyone Can Win. In addition, Capp was a frequent celebrity guest. His appearances on NBC's The Tonight Show spanned three emcees; Steve Allen, Jack Paar and Johnny Carson.

Filmography

Comic strip adaptationsAnimation'''
 Kickapoo Juice (1944) Columbia
 Amoozin' but Confoozin (1944) Columbia
 A Pee-kool-yar Sit-chee-ay-shun (1944) Columbia
 Porkuliar Piggy (1944) Columbia
 Sadie Hawkins Day (1944) Columbia
TV AnimationThe New Shmoo 1980 (Hanna-Barbera)

Live-action

 Li'l Abner (1940) RKO Radio Pictures
 Fearless Fosdick (1952) NBC (series) 13 episodes
 Li'l Abner (1959) Paramount
 Li'l Abner (5 September 1967) NBC (unsold television pilot with Sammy Jackson and Judy Canova)
 Li'l Abner (26 April 1971) ABC (TV special)
 Li'l Abner in Dogpatch Today (9 November 1978) NBC (TV special)

Beyond the comic strip
 "ABNER" was the name given to the first codebreaking computer used by the National Security Agency. According to longtime NSA computer expert Samuel Simon Snyder, "We chose the name from Li'l Abner Yokum, the comic strip character who was a big brute, but not very smart, because we believed that computers, which can be big and do brute-force operations, aren't very bright either. They can only follow simple instructions but can't think for themselves." ABNER was originally given only 15 simple programs, later doubled to 30. Nevertheless, when it was secretly completed in April 1952 it was the "most sophisticated computer of its time."
 The 1989 film I Want to Go Home (Je Veux Rentrer a la Maison, screenplay by Jules Feiffer) has a scene where the main character, a retired cartoonist played by Adolph Green, makes an unexpectedly emotional appeal for Al Capp and his legacy.
 The original Dogpatch is a historical part of San Francisco dating back to the 1860s that escaped the earthquake and fire of 1906. 
 Later in the 20th century, U.S. Army and Marine Corps units in Vietnam during the Vietnam War called their housing compounds "Dogpatches", due to the primitive living conditions.
 Li'l Abner, Daisy Mae, Wolf Gal, Earthquake McGoon, Lonesome Polecat, Hairless Joe, Sadie Hawkins, Silent Yokum and Fearless Fosdick all found their way onto the painted noses of bomber aircraft during World War II and the Korean War, as did Kickapoo Joy Juice, Lena the Hyena and the Shmoo. Moonbeam McSwine was immortalized as the P-51D Mustang USAAF bomber escort fighter flown by ace pilot Capt. William T. Whisner, still operable and appearing in aviator air shows as of 2008. During the Second World War, the RCAF 418 Search and Rescue Operational Training Squadron obtained permission to put the Dogpatch characters on their de Havilland Mosquito fighter-bombers and post-war, their Mitchell bombers.
 Al Capp always claimed to have effectively created the miniskirt, when he first put one on Daisy Mae in 1934.
 Li'l Abner was censored for the first, but not the last time in September 1947, and was pulled from papers by Scripps-Howard. The controversy, as reported in Time, centered on Capp's portrayal of the US Senate. Said Edward Leech of Scripps, "We don't think it is good editing or sound citizenship to picture the Senate as an assemblage of freaks and crooks... boobs and undesirables."
 Li'l Abner has one odd design quirk that has puzzled readers for decades: the part in his hair always faces the viewer, no matter which direction Abner is facing. In response to the question "Which side does Abner part his hair on?", Capp would answer, "Both." Capp claimed that he found the right "look" for Li'l Abner with Henry Fonda's character Dave Tolliver in The Trail of the Lonesome Pine (1936). Fonda later commented, "He's never told me, but I was told he has said that."
 Joan Baez took Al Capp to court in 1967 over Joanie Phoanie. She did not ask for damages; it was instead a bid to force a public retraction. The judge decided in Capp's favor, however. Declaring that satire was also protected free speech, he refused to order Capp to cease and desist. In recent years, Baez has admitted to being more amused by the parody — even including an excerpt in her memoirs (And a Voice to Sing With: A Memoir, published in 1987). "I wish I could have laughed at this at the time," she wrote in a caption under one of the strips.
 "I didn't start this Mammy Yokum did." was the reply Ralph Kramden told his wife Alice (concerning a comment made by Ralph's mother in-law) in Episode #2 Funny Money of The Honeymooners.
 In 1960, Dixieland trombonist Turk Murphy christened his San Francisco jazz club "Earthquake McGoon's", in honor of the perennial Dogpatch villain.
 In 1968, the first year of operation, Dogpatch USA had 300,000 visitors. Admission was $1.50 for adults, and half price for children. Al Capp's son Colin Capp worked at the park that year, and met and married Vicki Cox, the actress portraying Moonbeam McSwine. Capp had previously spoofed the idea of a theme park based on his characters in Li'l Abner, in a 1955 Disneyland parody called "Hal Yappland".
 Al Capp designed the  statue of Josiah Flintabattey Flonatin ("Flinty") that graces the city of Flin Flon, Manitoba. The town's name is taken from the lead character in a 1905 dime novel, The Sunless City by J. E. Preston Muddock. Capp donated his time and talent to create the image. The character is of such importance to the identity of the city that the local Chamber of Commerce commissioned the minting of a $3.00 coin, which was considered legal tender within the city during the year following its issue. The Chamber had the fiberglass sculpture moved to its present location at the Flin Flon Tourist Park in 1962.
 "Natcherly", Capp's bastardization of "naturally", turns up occasionally in popular culture — even without a specifically rural theme. It can be found in West Side Story, for instance, in Stephen Sondheim's original lyrics to "Gee, Officer Krupke" (1957).
 Mell Lazarus, creator of Miss Peach and Momma, wrote a comic novel in 1963 titled The Boss Is Crazy, Too. It was partly inspired by his apprenticeship days working for Al Capp and his brother Elliot Caplin at Toby Press, which published Shmoo Comics in the late 1940s. In a seminar at the Charles Schulz Museum on November 8, 2008, Lazarus called his experience at Toby "the five funniest years of my life." Lazarus went on to cite Capp as one of the "four essentials" in the field of newspaper cartoonists — along with Walt Kelly, Charles Schulz and Milton Caniff.
 Utah governor Gary Herbert controversially referred to himself as "Available Jones", the Dogpatch entrepreneur who does anything for a price, at a private meeting with lobbyists April 27, 2016 to raise funds for his re-election campaign.

References

Further reading
Since his death in 1979, Al Capp and his work have been the subject of more than 40 books, including three biographies. Underground cartoonist and Li'l Abner expert Denis Kitchen has published, co-published, edited, or otherwise served as a consultant on nearly all of them. Kitchen is currently compiling a monograph on the life and career of Al Capp.

 Capp, Al, Li'l Abner in New York (1936) Whitman Publishing
 Capp, Al, Li'l Abner Among the Millionaires (1939) Whitman Publishing
 Capp, Al, Li'l Abner and Sadie Hawkins Day (1940) Saalfield Publishing
 Capp, Al, Li'l Abner and the Ratfields (1940) Saalfield Publishing
 Sheridan, Martin, Comics and Their Creators (1942) R.T. Hale & Co. (1977) Hyperion Press
 Waugh, Coulton, The Comics (1947) Macmillan Publishers
 Capp, Al, Newsweek Magazine (November 24, 1947) "Li'l Abner's Mad Capp"
 Capp, Al, Saturday Review of Literature (March 20, 1948) "The Case for the Comics"
 Capp, Al, The Life and Times of the Shmoo (1948) Simon & Schuster
 Capp, Al, The Nation (March 21, 1949) "There Is a Real Shmoo"
 Capp, Al, Cosmopolitan Magazine (June 1949) "I Don't Like Shmoos"
 Capp, Al, Atlantic Monthly (April 1950) "I Remember Monster"
 Capp, Al, Time Magazine (November 6, 1950) "Die Monstersinger"
 Capp, Al, Life Magazine (March 31, 1952) "It's Hideously True!!..."
 Capp, Al, Real Magazine (December 1952) "The REAL Powers in America"
 Capp, Al, The World of Li'l Abner (1953) Farrar, Straus & Young
 Leifer, Fred, The Li'l Abner Official Square Dance Handbook (1953) A.S. Barnes
 Mikes, George, Eight Humorists (1954) Allen Wingate (1977) Arden Library
 Lehrer, Tom, The Tom Lehrer Song Book, introduction by Al Capp (1954) Crown Publishers
 Capp, Al, Al Capp's Fearless Fosdick: His Life and Deaths (1956) Simon & Schuster
 Capp, Al, Al Capp's Bald Iggle: The Life it Ruins May Be Your Own (1956) Simon & Schuster
 Capp, Al, et al. Famous Artists Cartoon Course — 3 volumes (1956) Famous Artists School
 Capp, Al, Life Magazine (January 14, 1957) "The Dogpatch Saga: Al Capp's Own Story"
 Brodbeck, Arthur J, et al. "How to Read Li'l Abner Intelligently" from Mass Culture: Popular Arts in America, pp. 218–224 (1957) Free Press
 Capp, Al, The Return of the Shmoo (1959) Simon & Schuster
 Hart, Johnny, Back to B.C., introduction by Al Capp (1961) Fawcett Publications
 Lazarus, Mell, Miss Peach, introduction by Al Capp (1962) Pyramid Books
 Gross, Milt, He Done Her Wrong, introduction by Al Capp (1963 Ed.) Dell Books
 White, David Manning, and Robert H. Abel, eds. The Funnies: An American Idiom (1963) Free Press
 White, David Manning, ed. From Dogpatch to Slobbovia: The (Gasp!) World of Li'l Abner (1964) Beacon Press
 Capp, Al, Life International Magazine (June 14, 1965) "My Life as an Immortal Myth"
 Toffler, Alvin, Playboy Magazine (December 1965) interview with Al Capp, pp. 89–100
 Moger, Art, et al. Chutzpah Is, introduction by Al Capp (1966) Colony Publishers
 Berger, Arthur Asa, Li'l Abner: A Study in American Satire (1969) Twayne Publishers (1994) Univ. Press of Mississippi 
 Sugar, Andy, Saga Magazine (December 1969) "On the Campus Firing Line with Al Capp"
 Gray, Harold, Arf! The Life and Hard Times of Little Orphan Annie, introduction by Al Capp (1970) Arlington House
 Moger, Art, Some of My Best Friends are People, introduction by Al Capp (1970) Directors Press
 Capp, Al, The Hardhat's Bedtime Story Book (1971) Harper & Row 
 Robinson, Jerry, The Comics: An Illustrated History of Comic Strip Art (1974) G.P. Putnam's Sons
 Horn, Maurice, The World Encyclopedia of Comics (1976) Chelsea House (1982) Avon
 Blackbeard, Bill, ed. The Smithsonian Collection of Newspaper Comics (1977) Smithsonian Inst. Press/Harry Abrams
 Marschall, Rick, Cartoonist PROfiles #37 (March 1978) interview with Al Capp
 Capp, Al, The Best of Li'l Abner (1978) Holt, Rinehart & Winston 
 Lardner, Ring, You Know Me Al: The Comic Strip Adventures of Jack Keefe, introduction by Al Capp (1979) Harcourt Brace Jovanovich
 Van Buren, Raeburn, Abbie an' Slats — 2 volumes (1983) Ken Pierce Books
 Capp, Al, Li'l Abner: Reuben Award Winner Series Book 1 (1985) Blackthorne
 Marschall, Rick, Nemo, the Classic Comics Library #18, pp. 3–32 (April 1986)
 Capp, Al, Li'l Abner Dailies — 27 volumes (1988–1999) Kitchen Sink Press
 Marschall, Rick, America's Great Comic Strip Artists (1989) Abbeville Press
 Capp, Al, Fearless Fosdick (1990) Kitchen Sink 
 Capp, Al, My Well-Balanced Life on a Wooden Leg (1991) John Daniel & Co. 
 Capp, Al, Fearless Fosdick: The Hole Story (1992) Kitchen Sink 
 Goldstein, Kalman, "Al Capp and Walt Kelly: Pioneers of Political and Social Satire in the Comics" from Journal of Popular Culture; Vol. 25, Issue 4 (Spring 1992)
 Caplin, Elliot, Al Capp Remembered (1994) Bowling Green State University 
 Theroux, Alexander, The Enigma of Al Capp (1999) Fantagraphics Books 
 Lubbers, Bob, Glamour International #26: The Good Girl Art of Bob Lubbers (May 2001)
 Capp, Al, The Short Life and Happy Times of the Shmoo (2002) Overlook Press 
 Capp, Al, Al Capp's Li'l Abner: The Frazetta Years — 4 volumes (2003–2004) Dark Horse Comics
 Al Capp Studios, Al Capp's Complete Shmoo: The Comic Books (2008) Dark Horse 
 Capp, Al, Li'l Abner: The Complete Dailies and Color Sundays Vol. 1: 1934–1936 (2010) IDW Publishing 
 Capp, Al, Li'l Abner: The Complete Dailies and Color Sundays Vol. 2: 1937–1938 (2010) IDW 
 Capp, Al, Li'l Abner: The Complete Dailies and Color Sundays Vol. 3: 1939–1940 (2011) IDW 
 Capp, Al, Al Capp's Complete Shmoo Vol. 2: The Newspaper Strips (2011) Dark Horse 
 Capp, Al, Li'l Abner: The Complete Dailies and Color Sundays Vol. 4: 1941–1942 (2012) IDW 
 Inge, M. Thomas, "Li'l Abner, Snuffy and Friends" from Comics and the U.S. South, pp. 3–27 (2012) Univ. Press of Mississippi 
 Capp, Al, Li'l Abner: The Complete Dailies and Color Sundays Vol. 5: 1943–1944 (2012) IDW 
 Kitchen, Denis, and Michael Schumacher, Al Capp: A Life to the Contrary'' (2013) Bloomsbury Publishing

External links

 Official Li'l Abner website
 "Dogpatch Confidential" by Dennis Drabelle (Salon, 30 Sept. 2002)
 Animation Resources: Li'l Abner part I
 Animation Resources: Li'l Abner part II
 Animation Resources: Li'l Abner part III
 Animation Resources: Li'l Abner part IV
 Animation Resources: Li'l Abner part V
 "Al Capp Deserves a Tribute" (Newburyport News, 28 Sept. 2009)
 NCS Spotlight on: Al Capp

 
Comic strips set in the United States
Kentucky in fiction
American comic strips
1934 comics debuts
1977 comics endings
Works about Appalachia
Fictional hillbillies
Humor comics
Satirical comics
Fantasy comics
Li'l Abner characters
Characters created by Al Capp
Comics adapted into animated series
American comics adapted into films
Comics adapted into radio series
1939 radio programme debuts
1940 radio programme endings
American comedy radio programs
NBC radio programs
Radio programs based on comic strips
Comics adapted into plays
Columbia cartoons series and characters
American satire
American political satire
Screen Gems film series